Harpsong is a novel by Rilla Askew published in 2007. It is volume one in Oklahoma Stories and Storytellers, from University of Oklahoma Press.

Harpsong received the Oklahoma Book Award, the Western Heritage Award, the WILLA Literary Award from Women Writing the West, and the Violet Crown Award from the Writers' League of Texas in 2008.

Harpsong tells the story of Harlan Singer and his teenage wife Sharon, on the road in the midwest during the Great Depression.

External links 
Harpsong website
Rilla Askew's website

Novels by Rilla Askew
2007 American novels
Great Depression novels
University of Oklahoma Press books